In 1986 because of inflation banknotes of the cruzado were issued by Central Bank of Brazil in denominations of 10, 50, 100, 500, 1000, 5000 and 10 000 cruzados. This bank had the sole authority to issue cruzado notes and Casa da Moeda do Brasil was the sole printer of these banknotes. Cruzado notes on the front/obverse featured prominent people while on the back/reverse depicted buildings  and/or activities of those people mentioned before. Between 1989 and 1990 cruzado currency had also been replaced, this time by cruzado novo at a rate of 1 cruzado to 1000 cruzados novos.

History
The name cruzado was inspired by the name of an old Portuguese silver coin, which had value of 400/480 réis and that circulated in the time in which Brazil was still a colony of Portugal.
On 28 February 1986 cruzado currency was created by José Sarney, the 31st president of Brazil, when Dilson Funaro was the minister of Finance, through Cruzado plan as part of a set of economic measures to freeze wages and prices. It was marked by return of centavo as a subdivision of the currency, since it had been abolished in 1984, due to devaluation of cruzeiro (second).

Cruzeiro (second) with cruzado overstamp
Cruzado replaced cruzeiro (second) at a rate of 1 cruzado to 1000 cruzeiros. From 28 February 1986 on 10 000 cruzeiros notes with face of Ruy Barbosa, 50 000 cruzeiros notes with face of Oswaldo Cruz and 100 000 cruzeiros notes with face of Juscelino Kubitschek were reused with only on front/obverse round-shaped overstamps of value 10, 50 and 100 cruzados. All these banknotes were 154 x 74 mm in size and consisted of series year 1986.

Cruzado
In October 1986 started the distribution of cruzado banknotes in a new standard. These banknotes had only replaced caption and face value of 10, 50 and 100 cruzados. New 500 cruzados notes with face of Heitor Villa-Lobos were also released in October 1986. New 1000 cruzados banknotes with face of Machado de Assis were issued in 1987. While new 5000 cruzados notes with face of Candido Portinari and new 10 000 cruzados notes with face of Carlos Chagas were released in 1988, and these would become the last banknotes of this monetary standard. Cruzado currency was represented by symbol Cz$ and had code ISO 4217 BRC. All cruzados banknotes were 154 x 74 mm in size and were withdrawn from circulation throughout the 1990.

Cruzado banknote not issued
There was a plan of 50 000 cruzados banknote with effigie of Carlos Drummond de Andrade to be released in 1989. However it was not launched due to change of currency for cruzado novo in January 1989.

Cruzado with cruzado novo overstamp
On 15 January 1989 cruzado novo was created by José Sarney 31st president of Brazil, when Naílson da Nóbrega was minister of Finance, through Summer plan (fourth stabilization plan) which was aimed at controlling rising inflation. Inflation went from 228% in year 1987 to 629% in year 1988. Cruzado novo replaced cruzado at a rate of 1 cruzado novo to 1000 cruzados, but was short-lived from 15 January 1989 until 15 March 1990 just 14 months.  Banknotes of 1000 cruzados with face of Machado de Assis, 5000 cruzados with face of Candido Portinari and 10 000 cruzados with face of Carlos Chagas were reused with only on front/obverse triangular overstamps of value 1, 5 and 10 cruzados novos. All these banknote were 154 x 74 mm in size and of series year 1989. Cruzado novo was represented by symbol NCz$ and had ISO 4217 BRN.

See also
 Brazilian cruzado
 Brazilian cruzado novo
 Brazilian cruzeiro
 Hyperinflation in Brazil
 Timeline of Brazilian economic stabilization plans
 Albert Pick

Footnotes

References

External links
 Images of the Brazilian cruzados banknotes (Pick nr 206 to 218) are downloaded from this public-domain website.